The Port of Bechet is one of the largest Romanian river ports, located in the city of Bechet on the Danube River. At Portul Bechet, there is a 126.5 metres tall unused electricity pylon, which was built in 1967 for the former 220 kV-line from Ișalnița to Kozlodui .

References

Ports and harbours of Romania